Loudon Township, Ohio, may refer to:

Loudon Township, Carroll County, Ohio
Loudon Township, Seneca County, Ohio

Ohio township disambiguation pages